The central bank of Bangladesh is known as Bangladesh Bank. Under the Bangladesh Bank Order, 1972, Bangladesh is established on 16 December 1971. The chief executive of the bank is described as Governor. The 11th and current Governor is Fazle Kabir, appointed 17 March 2017

Governors list

See more
 Bangladesh Bank

References

Banking in Bangladesh
Lists of office-holders in Bangladesh
Economy of Bangladesh-related lists
 
Bangladesh